Wolff von Eggenberg (died 1615) was an Austrian military officer and Freiherr of the House of Eggenberg.

He was the nephew and sole heir of Ruprecht von Eggenberg.  Like his uncle, Wolff von Eggenberg chose a military career and received the command of Imperial Forces as General-Obrist (imperfect translation is Colonel-General) on the border to Croatia.  He died in 1615 in the fortress Karlstadt and was interred beside his uncle in the mausoleum of Ehrenhausen.

Literature 
Die Fürsten und Freiherren zu Eggenberg und ihre Vorfahren. By Walther Ernest Heydendorff. Graz: Verlag Styria, 1965.

Barons of Austria
1615 deaths
Year of birth unknown